Group 3 of the 1970 FIFA World Cup was contested in Guadalajara's Estadio Jalisco between 2 and 11 June 1970. Brazil won the group, and advanced to the quarter-finals, along with World Cup holders England. Romania and Czechoslovakia failed to advance.

Standings

Matches
All times local (UTC−6)

England vs Romania

Brazil vs Czechoslovakia

Romania vs Czechoslovakia

Brazil vs England

Brazil vs Romania

England vs Czechoslovakia

References

Group 3
Group
Czechoslovakia at the 1970 FIFA World Cup
Group
Group